Griesheim is a town in the Darmstadt-Dieburg district in Hesse, Germany. It is situated west of Darmstadt.

History
The area of Griesheim has been inhabited since around 4500 BCE yet it was first mentioned in 1165 CE.
Wine was an important source of income in Griesheim in earlier times.

The Thirty Year War hit Griesheim hard. The surviving inhabitants fled behind the walls of the Darmstadt, where many of them died of the plague. By the end of the war in 1648 only about 370 were left, who set out to rebuild the community.

The late 18th, early 19th Century a major industry was the production and trade of fir tree seeds. The city also became a center of woodwork-craft.

The Protestant Reformation was introduced to the town in 1529. In 1874 in the southwest part of Griesheim an artillery range opened. In 1908 August Euler opened one of the first airfields in Germany. Griesheim was occupied by France from 1918 to 1930. During World War II, 65% of its buildings were destroyed, and after the war it housed some 4000 refugees. After successful reconstruction, Griesheim on 12 September 1965 was granted township rights by the Hessian state government. Farming is still an important part of the city. Griesheim has a city museum to remember its past and its connection to St. Stephen. The Griesheim museum has archaeological finds.

Since 1977 the "Griesheim Week" festival is held in onion market in Griesheim.  The festival takes place in Griesheim city center between Wagenhalle and Hans-Karl-place on the last or next to last weekend of September.

The area of Griesheim has belonged to the following in the past:
1806 to 1820: Office Pfungstadt, which belonged to the province Starkenburgring the Grand Duchy of Hesse.
1821-1832: District Dörnberg in the province Starkenburgring.
1832-1848: Gross-Gerau district, with the beginning of the Grand Duchy of Hesse.
1848 to 1852: Region of Darmstadt, while the division of the province Stark castle in administrative districts.
1852-1938: Darmstadt circle with the reintroduction of the province Starkenburgring.
1938-1977: County Darmstadt. As part of local government reform in 1938, the three Hessian provinces Starkenburgring, Rheinhessen and Oberhessen.
1977: Darmstadt-Dieburg, in the district of Darmstadt from municipal reform in Hesse.

Trams

Tram Lines 9 and 4 run between Griesheim and Darmstadt. The central nodal point of the Darmstadt tramway network is the Luisenplatz in the city center of Darmstadt. Bus lines 45 and 46 go from Griesheim to   Riedstadt, Groß-Gerau and Trebur.

Roads
The main road passing west-east is the Bundesstraße 26, or B26. 
Griesheim  is situated  just west of the Bundesautobahn 5 and Bundesautobahn 67 west of the Autobahn-interchange Darmstädter Kreuz (Darmstadt Cross).

Twin towns – sister cities

Griesheim is twinned with:
 Bar-le-Duc, France (1975)
 Gyönk, Hungary (1990)
 Pontassieve, Italy (2008)

Since 1990, Griesheim also has a town friendship with Wilkau-Haßlau in Germany.

Gallery

See also
Trams in Darmstadt

References

External links
 
Weatherstats of Griesheim

Darmstadt-Dieburg